Rineloricaria hoehnei is a species of catfish in the family Loricariidae. It is native to South America, where it occurs in the Paraguay River basin in Brazil. The species reaches 5.8 cm (2.3 inches) in standard length and is believed to be a facultative air-breather. In 2011, Rineloricaria hoehnei was found to be a probable junior synonym of Rineloricaria lanceolata, although FishBase recognizes both as distinct and valid species.

References 

Fish described in 1912
Catfish of South America
Loricariini